Derek Sean van den Berg  (born 2 January 1946) is a former South African rugby union player.

Playing career
Van den Berg made his provincial debut for Western Province in 1968. After completing his medical studies at the University of Cape Town he moved to Natal en made his debut for Natal in 1971.

Van den Berg tour with the Springboks to France in 1974 but did not play in any test matches. He made his test debut for the Springboks in 1975, during the return tour by France to South Africa, in the first test played on 21 June 1975 at the Free State Stadium in Bloemfontein. Van den Berg played four test matches and tree tour matches for the Springboks.

Test history

See also
List of South Africa national rugby union players – Springbok no.  484

References

1946 births
Living people
South African rugby union players
South Africa international rugby union players
Western Province (rugby union) players
Sharks (Currie Cup) players
University of Cape Town alumni
Rugby union players from Cape Town
Rugby union props
Rugby union locks